Faqirwali ,  is a town of Bahawalnagar District in the Punjab province of eastern Pakistan.

Climate 
The average climate of Faqirwali is hot and humid. The temperature extremes occur during the months of May, June, and July, when the temperature reaches up to 49-53 °C. In August, the monsoon seasons starts, with heavy rainfall throughout the area. December and January are the coldest months, when temperatures can drop up to -1 °C.
The annual average rainfall is 160 mm.

References

Populated places in Bahawalnagar District